Professor Saifuddin Soz (born 23 November 1937) is an Indian professor and seven term Member of the Parliament of India. Soz hails from the Indian Union territory of Jammu and Kashmir.

He had been India's Minister of Water Resources in India's 14th Lok Sabha and Minister of Environment and Forests in the 1990s.
In January 2006, he was nominated to the Congress Working Committee, the executive committee of the Indian National Congress.

Early life
Soz was born in Sopore, a township in the northern Kashmir Valley. He worked his way to completing a master's degree in economics from the University of Kashmir, where he later held the position of registrar.

From there, Soz moved to the Jammu and Kashmir State Board of School Education (BOSE), a government department responsible for administration of schools. Soz sought voluntary retirement from government service to enter politics in 1983. At that time, he was Secretary of the BOSE.

Career

In 1983, Lok Sabha election, Soz contested and won the Baramulla seat as a candidate of the ruling Jammu and Kashmir National Conference party.

At the time, the JKNC was headed by Farooq Abdullah. Soz went on to win three more Lok Sabha elections as a member of the JKNC. He also represented the JKNC and the state of Jammu and Kashmir in the Rajya Sabha in the mid-'90s.

In 1997-98, he became India's Minister of Environment and Forests in the cabinet of Prime Minister Inder Kumar Gujral. Before that in 1996-97, Soz served in the same capacity under Prime Minister H.D. Deve Gowda.

In 1999, Soz was expelled from the JKNC for voting against the government of Prime Minister Atal Behari Vajpayee. Soz was a JKNC member of parliament and defied his party's leadership.  His vote brought the BJP government down which led the then Prime Minister to tender his resignation.

In 2003, Soz joined the Congress party and was elected to the Rajya Sabha. In January 2006, he was inducted into the ministry of Prime Minister Manmohan Singh as Minister of Water Resources, a position he held until early 2009. Soz was appointed President of the Jammu and Kashmir Pradesh (state) Congress Committee in February 2008.

Soz was one of the front runners for the post of Vice-President of India in the 2007 Vice-Presidential election.

WikiLeaks
A US diplomatic cable leaked by the whistle blowing website WikiLeaks, claimed, Soz was facilitating a discreet dialogue between the Indian government and Kashmiri separatist leaders before 2006. The cable sent by then US Ambassador to India, David Mulford describes Soz, as a long standing 'contact' of the US Embassy's political section, with strong pro-US credentials. Furthermore, his elevation as a cabinet minister in the UPA government, was welcomed by the US government. 

The following observation was made in the below diplomatic cable-
"Another welcome addition to the cabinet is Kashmiri Congress Party Rajya Sabha member Saifuddin Soz, a long-standing contact of the Embassy's Political section. Soz, a Sonia Gandhi confidant, worked discreetly and diligently behind-the-scenes to help launch the PM's dialogue with Kashmiri separatists such as the Mirwaiz, Yasin Malik, and Sajjad Lone. For his loyal service and his successes on Kashmir diplomacy, Sonia has elevated him to the Cabinet. In doing so, she also ensured that a prominent and well-respected Kashmiri Muslim would occupy the important Water Resources portfolio. Kashmir has tremendous water resources, including massive untapped hydroelectric potential. Given the on-going dispute between India and Pakistan over the construction of the Baglihar dam on the Chenab River near Jammu, and Soz's new job's supervision of the India-Pakistan Indus Waters Treaty, Soz will play a key role in Delhi's efforts in Kashmir and its dialogue with Pakistan. Soz a professor is a moderate, earnest gentleman who has been a good friend of the US. He could potentially be Chief Minister of Kashmir one day, or rise even higher in the Cabinet, if he does a good job as minister. Comment- A Boost to US Energy Interests"

Bibliography
Soz has written and edited several books including:
 Kashmir Crisis (Soz, Saifuddin) (ed). 1993 
 Why Autonomy to Kashmir (Soz, Saifuddin) (ed). 1995
 Secularism - an Interpretation
 Daj (A play in Kashmiri on abuses of Dowry system)
 Kashmir- Glimpses of History and the Story of Struggle, His most comprehensive book on the history of the Kashmir Crisis and the Indo-Pak duopoly 

He also translated M. Illin's book 1,00,000 Whys from Russian to Kashmiri, an effort for which he received the Soviet Land Nehru Award. He has written essays and short stories in Kashmiri, several articles in reputed newspapers and journals on a variety of subjects like Islam and modernism, rights of women, secularism, literature, education and economics. He is also the recipient of several literary awards including Soviet Land Nehru Award, All India Basic Literature Competition Award and Competition for Literature for Neo-Literates Award.

References

1937 births
Living people
Indian Muslims
Kashmiri people
Rajya Sabha members from Jammu and Kashmir
Indian National Congress politicians from Jammu and Kashmir
India MPs 1984–1989
People from Sopore
India MPs 1989–1991
People from Baramulla district
India MPs 1998–1999
India MPs 1980–1984
Lok Sabha members from Jammu and Kashmir
Jammu & Kashmir National Conference politicians
University of Kashmir alumni